Cathexis longimana is a species of beetle in the family Cerambycidae. It was described by Pascoe in 1859. It is known from Argentina and Brazil.

References

Colobotheini
Beetles described in 1859